Agathe Sochat (born 21 May 1995) is a French rugby union player who plays for Stade Bordelais and the France women's national rugby union team.

Career
Sochat played for Stade Bordelais between 2013 and 2016 before joining Montpellier Hérault Rugby with whom she won the Élite 1 National Championships in 2017, 2018, and 2019 before rejoining Stade Bordelais in August 2021. In December 2021 she was named in World Rugby’s Women's Team of the Year. In 2022, She was named in France's team for the delayed 2021 Rugby World Cup in New Zealand.

Personal life
From Limoges, her parents are called Laurent and Christime. She began playing rugby aged 4 and they supported her in combining rugby with studying in Bordeaux and Montpellier. An occupational therapist, during the COVID-19 pandemic Sochat made masks for fellow frontline workers. In March 2022 she had a baby daughter with her wife Adele.

References

1995 births
Living people
French female rugby union players